Acanthocharax is a genus of fish in the family Characidae. It contains the single species Acanthocharax microlepis, which is endemic to Guyana, where it is found in the Essequibo River basin. It is found in fresh water at pelagic depths. This species is native to a tropical climate. This fish can reach a length of about 8.5 cm (3.3 in).

References

Characidae
Monotypic freshwater fish genera
Freshwater fish of South America
Fish of Guyana
Endemic fauna of Guyana
Fish described in 1912